The Champion Beer of Scotland (also known as CBOS) is an award for Scottish beers presented by the Campaign for Real Ale (CAMRA).

CAMRA also awards the Champion Beer of Britain and the Champion Beer of Wales.

Winners

References

Kelburn's Cart Blanche named Champion Beer of Scotland at the Scottish Traditional Beer Festival! 6/6/2006

Beer awards
Beer in Scotland
Scottish awards